Fergus Gordon Thomson Kerr  (born 16 July 1931) is a Scottish Roman Catholic priest of the English Dominican province. He has published significantly on a wide range of subjects, but is famous particularly for his work on Ludwig Wittgenstein and Thomas Aquinas.

Biography 
Following his education at Banff Academy and his service in the RAF (1953–1955), Kerr entered the Order of Preachers in 1956. He was ordained to the priesthood in 1962. Kerr studied in Aberdeen, Paris, Munich, and Oxford. He was a student of Donald M. MacKinnon, John Holloway, and Cornelius Ernst. From 1966 to 1986 he taught philosophy and theology at the University of Oxford.

In service to the English Dominican province, Kerr was Prior at Blackfriars Hall, Oxford from 1969 to 1978. From 1992 to 1998 he served as Prior at Blackfriars, Edinburgh.  In 1998, he returned to Blackfriars, Oxford, where he served as Regent until 2004. Kerr served as the Director of the Aquinas Institute, Blackfriars, Oxford and is the editor of New Blackfriars, the bimonthly journal of the English Dominicans (1995–present).

Currently, Kerr is affiliated with Blackfriars, Edinburgh, where he lives and works. He holds an honorary fellowship in the School of Divinity, University of Edinburgh and has a role in the university's Catholic chaplaincy team. He is also an Honorary Professor of St. Andrews University, a distinction he has held since 2005. Kerr belongs to the Catholic Theological Society of Great Britain, of which he was president from 1992 to 1994.

A festschrift was prepared in Kerr's honor entitled Faithful Reading.

Kerr was awarded an Honorary degree of Doctor of Divinity by the University of Edinburgh in December 2019.

Bibliography

Books

Book reviews

References

1931 births
Living people
20th-century British Roman Catholic theologians
20th-century Royal Air Force personnel
20th-century Scottish Roman Catholic priests
Academics of the University of Edinburgh
Academics of the University of Oxford
Academics of the University of St Andrews
Catholic philosophers
New Blackfriars people
People educated at Banff Academy
People from Banff, Aberdeenshire
Regents of Blackfriars, Oxford
Scottish Dominicans
Analytical Thomists